Cinedigm Corp. is an American entertainment company headquartered in Los Angeles, California. Cinedigm's businesses encompass digital cinema, streaming channels, content marketing, and distribution.

History

Early years
Cinedigm Corp was founded in 2000 under the name Access IT Digital Media, Inc., through a group led by Bud Mayo. Mayo directed Cinedigm until his retirement in 2010, and subsequently founded Digital Cinema Destinations Corp. In September 2013, the company changed its name to Cinedigm Corp. In January 2011, Chris McGurk became the new chairman and CEO.

In July 2011, Cinedigm sold its physical and electronic distribution business to Technicolor. The following month, Screenvision acquired UniqueScreen Media, Inc. (USM), the cinema advertising division of Cinedigm Digital Cinema Corp. The companies entered into a long-term agreement, with Cinedigm providing distribution and promotion for Screenvision.

In April 2012, Cinedigm acquired distributor company New Video.

In October 2013, the company acquired Gaiam Vivendi Entertainment.

In May 2014, Cinedigm established Docurama, an OTT documentary channel, focused on documentaries and film festival coverage.

Later that year, Jeffrey Edell would join as CFO, and the company began trading on the NASDAQ under the ticker symbol.

Expansion into Video on Demand
In February 2015, Cinedigm and Wizard World launched CONtv. In June of that year, Cinedigm would acquire a minority stake in Shout! Factory. Finally, in September, Cinedigm partnered with The Dove Foundation to create The Dove Channel, an online streaming service focusing on faith-based programming.

In December 2017, control of Cinedigm was given to Bison Capital of Hong Kong to start one of the first China-U.S Studios.

On February 5, 2019, Cinedigm acquired streaming service Viewster and its Viewster Anime subsidiary. Viewster would eventually merge with CONtv and rebrand as CONtv Anime on June 13, 2020.

In April of that year, Cinedigm licensed content from Chinese firms CCTV, China Lion, Starrise Media and Youku, in order to launch an entertainment and film service called Bambu; the service would launch on October 22, 2019.

In 2020, Cinedigm acquired The Film Detective.

In February 2021, Cinedigm acquired the horror-genre streaming service, Screambox. Later that year, on September 21, 2021, Cinedigm acquired Bloody Disgusting. As part of the acquisition, Screambox would be relaunched under the curation and management of Bloody Disgusting.

In August 2021, Cinedigm announced a partnership with Robert Rodriguez to relaunch the former cable and satellite-based El Rey Network as a streaming channel.

In December 2021, Cinedigm signed a deal with SideStream, a live video streaming service.

In March 2022, Cinedigm acquired streaming, advertising and distribution company, Digital Media Rights; including the ad-supported streaming services Cinehouse, AsianCrush, RetroCrush, Midnight Pulp, Cocoro, and KMTV.

On September 15, 2022, Cinedigm launched Cineverse, marketed as the company's flagship streaming service, featuring programming from across its AVOD (ad-supported video on demand) and FAST (free, ad-supported, television) brands.

Television and streaming
Cinedigm owns or distributes programming from the following brands as of 2022.

AsianCrush
Bloody Disgusting TV
Screambox
The Bob Ross Channel
Cinehouse
Cocoro
Comedy Dynamics (The Nacelle Company)
CONtv
CONtv Anime
The Country Network (TCN Country, LLC)
Docurama
The Dove Channel
El Rey Network (Robert Rodriguez / FactoryMade Ventures)
Fandor
FashionBox HD
The Film Detective
Gametoon
KMTV
The Lone Star Channel
Midnight Pulp
My Time Movie Network
Real Madrid TV (Real Madrid Club de Fútbol)
RetroCrush
So...Real

References

External links

 
2000 establishments in California
American companies established in 2000
Entertainment companies established in 2000
Mass media companies established in 2000
Digital media organizations
Entertainment companies based in California
Companies listed on the Nasdaq
Companies based in Los Angeles
Film distributors of the United States
Home video companies of the United States
Mass media companies of the United States